Jamtara is a city and a notified area in Jamtara district in the Indian state of Jharkhand

Jamtara also refers to:

 Jamtara, Bardhaman, in West Bengal state, India
 Jamtara block, a community development block in Jamtara district, Jharkhand, India
 Jamtara district, one of the 24 districts of Jharkhand, India
 Jamtara (Vidhan Sabha constituency)
 Jamtara Sadar subdivision, in Jamtara district, Jharkhand, India
 Jamtara College, undergraduate college in Jamtara, Jharkhand, India
 Jamtara – Sabka Number Ayega, an Indian crime drama web television series
 Jamtara, Giridih, a census town in Giriidh district, Jharkhand, India